Marc E. Chavannes (20 September 1946, The Hague) is a Dutch professor for journalism at Groningen University and active journalist, Correspondent (in London, Paris and Washington D.C.) and commentator e.g. for NRC Handelsblad.

Prizes
 1988: Prijs voor de Dagbladjournalistiek
 2004: Anne Vondelingprijs
 2020 Anne Vondelingprijs

Sources

1946 births
Living people
Journalists from The Hague
Dutch bloggers
Dutch newspaper editors
Dutch reporters and correspondents
Leiden University alumni
Columbia University Graduate School of Journalism alumni
Academic staff of the University of Groningen